The 2020–21 Women's FIH Pro League was the second season of the Pro League, the premier women's field hockey national team league series. The tournament started in January 2020 and finished in June 2021.

Format changes
The home and away principle was kept but this principle is split over two consecutive seasons from this season onwards and work according to the following example:

in season 2020-21, Team A will host Team B twice within a couple of days.
in season 2021-22, Team B will host Team A twice within a couple of days.
If one of the two matches played between two teams is cancelled, the winner of the other match will receive double points.

The grand final will not be played this edition because of the time proximity with the 2020 Olympic Games.

Coronavirus pandemic interruption
Due to the outbreak COVID-19 pandemic in China, the FIH decided in late January to put on hold the matches between China and Belgium, initially scheduled on 8 and 9 February in Changzhou. For the rest of the upcoming matches in China, the FIH monitored the evolution of the situation closely and following the recommendations of the World Health Organization applied in early February the same measures for the matches scheduled on 14 and 15 March against Australia, Meanwhile, it was evaluated the possibility for China to play these and their other matches on hold in alternative locations.

In the wake of the COVID-19 pandemic outbreak in Europe, Hockey Australia decided to suspend all international travels for its national teams until further notice in early March. The matches against Germany and Netherlands, scheduled on 21 and 22 and 26 and 29 March respectively, were postponed. Later Hockey New Zealand took the same decision, postponing their matches scheduled on 19 and 22 March against Netherlands and on 28 and 29 March against Germany.

Once declared as a pandemic on 11 March, the FIH and all participating National Associations involved in the competition decided to put all the matches scheduled until 15 April on hold. Furthermore, it was agreed that the current edition is maintained, no matches will be played after the Olympic Games and depending on the evolution of the situation and the decisions of the public authorities, every match which can be organized between late April and before the Olympics, shall be played. On 19 March, it was announced by the FIH that all the matches scheduled to play until 17 May were put on hold.

On 24 April, it was announced that the competition is extended until June 2021. The restart for September 2020, was announced on 9 July. Because not all matches are due to be played before the end of the season, the final ranking will be determined by points percentage instead of total points.

On 28 May, it was announced that despite the efforts of the involved federations, the matches set to play before the announcing date were going to be the last of the edition.

Teams
Nine teams competed in a round-robin tournament, being played from January to June.

 (3)
 (2)
 (12)
 (10)
 (4)
 (5)
 (1)
 (6)
 (13)

Squads

Results

Standings

All times are local.

Fixtures

As a mark of respect for United States manager Larry Amar, who died that week whilst with the team, their first match of the FIH Pro League was cancelled. In accordance with the League's regulations for a cancelled match, the points of the second match count double.

Game was abandoned at half time due to heavy rain and thunderstorms when Great Britain was leading 1–0. In accordance with the League's regulations for a cancelled match, the points of the first match count double.

Goalscorers

See also
2020–21 Men's FIH Pro League

Notes

References

External links

Women's FIH Pro League
FIH Pro League
Women
FIH Pro League
FIH Pro League